Sulfaperin (or sulfaperine) is a sulfonamide antibacterial.

References 

Pyrimidines
Sulfonamide antibiotics